"Ophelia" is a song recorded by American folk rock band the Lumineers. It was released as the lead single from their sophomore album Cleopatra on February 5, 2016.

As of August 2022, the song has garnered over 800 million streams on Spotify.

Background
The song started out as a slower instrumental demo that Jeremiah Fraites, (one sixth of the Lumineers), sent to Wesley Schultz (lead vocalist of the Lumineers), in 2011. According to Schultz, the demo generated enough excitement to work on the project. While playing at a backbar in LA alongside the Lumineers, Schultz wrote the song's hook.

Soon after, the Lumineers felt they needed to find a proper substitute for the name Ophelia, due to the fact that a song of the same name had been released years prior by the band, the Band. Nevertheless, this issue reached its end after Schultz decided that no other name had "the right musicality to it." Subsequently, Schultz had trouble writing "good" verses to carry the hook he wrote, which made the songwriting process so difficult that the project was completely abrogated until four years later. In January 2015, when it came time to work on a new record, the defunct "Ophelia" was resurrected.

Over a series of vocal demos, the song was recorded at The Clubhouse in Rhinebeck, New York.

On February 8, 2016, via Facebook, the single's cover art was premiered, along with an 18-second-long snippet of the song.

In an interview with Entertainment Weekly, Schultz said that the song's lyrics are "a vague reference to people falling in love with fame."

The song was featured on the CW's The Flash in the last scene of episode 22 of season 2, "Invincible".

The song was featured in the 2017 film Happy Death Day.

The song was featured in a 2017 commercial for American Express's "Shop Small" market campaign.

Critical reception
The song has received mixed reviews from music critics. The song was praised by Marina Watts of The Cornell Daily Sun; where Watts refers to "Ophelia" as "hauntingly beautiful", also noting that the song is "a march that wishes anyone who ever falls in love the best of luck." David Dye of NPR also viewed "Ophelia" positively, while comparing its musical influences and style to the Lumineers' earlier hit, "Ho Hey".

In a negative review Brunna Pimentel wrote for The Edge, she claimed to be disappointed with the song, stating that it "might have been an okay track for the middle of the album," but "as a single, it is undoubtedly anti-climatic. [sic]" Pimentel also criticized the song for its "repetitive" chorus.

Music video
The official music video was directed by Isaac Ravishankara, and released via the Lumineers' YouTube and Vevo accounts on February 12, 2016. As of January 2022, it has gained over 200 million views.

The Ballad of Cleopatra 
The Ballad of Cleopatra is a compilation of the story in the music videos for "Ophelia", "Cleopatra", "Sleep on the Floor", "Angela" and "My Eyes", all songs from the album Cleopatra. The video was released on the Lumineers YouTube channel on April 27, 2017.

Live performances
On April 7, 2016, the Lumineers performed "Ophelia" on The Tonight Show with Jimmy Fallon. The Lumineers also performed the song on Good Morning America on April 13, their first time on the show. A live performance of the song at the iHeartRadio music theater in Los Angeles was aired on Audience Network at 9pm on April 8.
On December 12, 2021, the Lumineers and Arkells performed a snippet of the song during the halftime show of the  CFL Grey Cup in Hamilton, Ontario.

Track listing

Personnel
Wesley Schultz – lead vocals, songwriting, tambourine, stomping
Jeremiah Fraites – songwriting, piano, stomping, drums
Bryon Isaacs – bass
Scott Chopps – bass
Ryan Hewitt – engineering, grand piano
Simone Felice – production, stomping

Charts

Weekly charts

Year-end charts

Decade-end charts

Certifications

References

External links
 
 
 

2016 singles
Dualtone Records singles
The Lumineers songs
2016 songs